LaBarque Creek Conservation Area (LCCA) consists of  in northwestern Jefferson County, Missouri. It is south of Pacific and southwest of Eureka. The LCCA is part of the Henry Shaw Ozark Corridor.

In 2005 the Missouri Department of Conservation purchased  from The Nature Conservancy and a private landowner. In December 2010, these  became a part of the Missouri Natural Areas System as LaBarque Creek Natural Area. None of the more recently acquired land is part of the designated natural area.

The LCCA has a  loop trail on its eastern side open to hiking only. The LCCA is open to archery deer hunting only.

The LaBarque watershed has a great variety of terrestrial natural communities, including small sandstone glades, forested fens and many kinds of woodland. There are at least 42 fish species in LaBarque Creek.

References

External links
Friends of LaBarque Creek Watershed

Protected areas of Jefferson County, Missouri
Protected areas established in 2005
Conservation Areas of Missouri